Montana Incident is a 1952 American Western film directed by Lewis D. Collins and starring Whip Wilson, Rand Brooks and Noel Neill.

The film's sets were designed by the art director Dave Milton.

Plot

Cast
 Whip Wilson as Whip Wilson 
 Rand Brooks as Dave Connors 
 Noel Neill as Frances Martin 
 Bruce Edwards as Arnold Benson 
 Peggy Stewart as Clara Martin 
 William Fawcett as Albert Hawkins 
 Terry Frost as Henchman Macklin 
 Marshall Reed as Henchman Crawford 
 Lyle Talbot as Mooney

References

Bibliography
 Martin, Len D. The Allied Artists Checklist: The Feature Films and Short Subjects of Allied Artists Pictures Corporation, 1947-1978. McFarland & Company, 1993.

External links
 

1952 films
1952 Western (genre) films
1950s English-language films
American Western (genre) films
Films directed by Lewis D. Collins
Monogram Pictures films
American black-and-white films
Films scored by Raoul Kraushaar
1950s American films